William Owusu Acheampong (born 13 September 1989) is a Ghanaian footballer who plays for Sint-Eloois-Winkel as a striker.

External links
 
 

1989 births
Living people
Footballers from Accra
Ghanaian footballers
Ghanaian expatriate footballers
Association football forwards
Belgian Pro League players
Challenger Pro League players
UAE Pro League players
UAE First Division League players
Liga I players
R.S.C. Anderlecht players
Sporting CP footballers
Real S.C. players
Gil Vicente F.C. players
Cercle Brugge K.S.V. players
K.V.C. Westerlo players
CSM Corona Brașov footballers
Royal Antwerp F.C. players
K.S.V. Roeselare players
Ajman Club players
Al Bataeh Club players
Fujairah FC players
Sint-Eloois-Winkel Sport players
Expatriate footballers in Portugal
Expatriate footballers in Romania
Expatriate footballers in Belgium
Expatriate footballers in the United Arab Emirates
Real Tamale United players